Shila Devi is the famous idol of Durga. Her temple is located in Amer Fort in Jaipur, India. The idol was brought by Raja Man Singh I of Amber from Jessore (now in Bangladesh) in 1604 CE. On the sixth day of winter Navratris, special prayers are offered to this goddess. Hundreds of thousands of people from Jaipur and surrounding areas gather to pay offerings to Shila Devi.

From folklore it is believed, this idol was carved from the same stone as the Dashabhuja idol of the Susanga Royal Family of Durgapur (now in Bangladesh). The Dashabhuja idol was stolen from Susanga and lost.

Foundation of the temple 
Towards the end of sixteenth century, Maharaja Mansingh brought the statue of the goddess Shila Mata from the eastern part of Bengal. In the kingdom of Pratapaditya, Maharaja Mansingh received a defeat at the hands of king Kedar. Humiliated and depressed, the Maharaja worshipped goddess Kali to please her and receive her blessings so as to change his defeat into victory. Kali  appeared in a dream to bless him. The goddess also obtained a promise from the Maharaja that he would establish her shrine in his capital. The idol of goddess was recovered from sea in the form of a Shila (Slab) and it was brought to Amer when cleaned and washed, the present idol appeared. This is why the goddess is named as Shila Mata.

References

Hindu temples in Rajasthan
Tourist attractions in Jaipur

2. http://devasthan.rajasthan.gov.in/images/Jaipur/ShilaDeviji.htm